Topaz Lake is a reservoir located on the California-Nevada border, about  south of Reno. The census-designated place of Topaz Lake, Nevada, is located along its northwest shore.

The modern reservoir was formed by diverting waters from the West Walker River into a nearby basin that had previously contained a smaller, natural lake. That lake had historical significance since it lay on the route taken by American explorer Jedediah Smith in late spring of 1827 when leaving California at the end of his first journey, the first crossing ever of the Sierra Nevada by a non-native. Smith came southeast through Monitor Pass, then east past Topaz Lake into Nevada.

In 1937, a new levee raised the capacity to its current . The levee and reservoir have been owned and operated by the Walker River Irrigation District since its construction.

Topaz Lake is popular for boaters, water-skiers, campers, and fishermen. Fishing season runs year-round, and the lake is stocked with trout by the Nevada Department of Wildlife and the California Department of Fish and Wildlife. The lake is easily reachable by U.S. Route 395. On the northwest shore of the lake is the Topaz Lodge and a residential area. There is also a volunteer fire station in the area.

U.S. Route 395 passes by the west side of the lake at the California-Nevada state line.

See also
 List of lakes in California
 U.S. Route 395 in California
 U.S. Route 395 in Nevada
 Coleville, California
 Topaz, California
 Walker, Mono County, California

References

External links
 Area map

Reservoirs in Nevada
Lakes of Douglas County, Nevada
Reservoirs in Mono County, California
Buildings and structures in Douglas County, Nevada
Lakes of the Great Basin
Tourist attractions in Douglas County, Nevada
Reservoirs in California
Reservoirs in Northern California